The following is the complete list of filmography by Colombian-American actor, stand-up comedian, film producer, playwright and screenwriter John Leguizamo.

Film

Television

Video games

Web

Music videos

Audio

References 

Leguizamo John
Leguizamo, John